Annette Hadding (born 3 December 1975) is a German former swimmer who competed in the 1992 Summer Olympics.

References

1975 births
Living people
German female swimmers
German female freestyle swimmers
Olympic swimmers of Germany
Swimmers at the 1992 Summer Olympics
Olympic bronze medalists for Germany
Olympic bronze medalists in swimming
Medalists at the 1992 Summer Olympics